Rubaiyat or Ruba'iyat or Rubayat may refer to:

Literature
 Ruba'iyat, a collection of rubaʿi, Persian-language poems having four lines (i.e. quatrains)
 Rubaiyat of Omar Khayyam or simply Rubaiyat, the title given by Edward Fitzgerald to his translations into English of ruba'i by Omar Khayyam
 "Reginald's Rubaiyat", a short story in the collection Reginald (1904) by Saki

Music
 Rubáiyát: Elektra's 40th Anniversary, a 1990 compilation album released by Elektra Records
 The Rubaiyat of Dorothy Ashby, a 1970 album by jazz harpist Dorothy Ashby

Other uses
 Rubayat, Iran, a village in South Khorasan Province